Ashraf Fahmy (Arabic: أشرف فهمي 25 August 1936 – 25 January 2001) was an Egyptian film director, active in the Egyptian film industry since the late 1960s. He was credited with launching his career and directing his first feature film (The Killers –  Arabic: القتلة) with the lead role played by the leading film star Salah Zulfikar, making a huge commercial success. Fahmy is a daring director frequently seen in film festivals worldwide, in addition he wrote the script of three films including (Until The End of Lifetime –  Arabic: حتى آخر العمر ), which is considered his most memorable movie.

Early academic life
Ashraf Fahmy earned a Bachelor degree of Arts (History major) from the Cairo University in 1961, then he graduated from the Egyptian High Cinema Institute in Giza (first class) in 1963 to start his career in the Egyptian cinema, after that he studied Directing at the University of California from 1964 until 1967.

Starting as a director
Fahmy worked as a director at the "National Center for Documentary Seetma", he directed his first short film; A New Life and was awarded for this film at "Dok Leipzigfilm festival", then worked as an assistant to Fatin Abdel Wahab, Abduel Rahman Khamisi and Youssef Chahine, then he directed his first Feature Film The Killers (1971).

Personal life
Ashraf Fahmy was born and raised in Cairo, he was a son of an Egyptian father of a high-class family of Cairo and a Turkish mother, got married twice and has one son Mostafa Ashraf Fahmy مصطفى أشرف فهمي and two daughters Jala Fahmy جالا فهمي from a different mother and Ingy, He died in the early 2001's during an open heart surgery leaving a legacy in Egyptian cinema.

Cinema
Since his first feature film (The Killers – Egyptian Arabic: القتلة) which was starred by Egypt's influential movie star Salah Zulfikar earning him huge box office success in Fahmy's debut. His films of the 70's, 80's & 90's gave him a reputation as a director of thrillers. He was involved in the Cinema Council Adarhmassh in 1969 and then nominated as Chairman of the board of directors of Studios, Production and High investment in 1977. throughout his career, he directed, wrote and produced over 50 feature films.

Awards
Fahmy was honored by Egyptian, Middle eastern & International Film Festivals. His most notable award was for A New life at the Dok Leipzig film festival of Leipzig, East Germany.

Filmography
Writer:
Execution of a Judge (1990)
School Teacher Assassination (1988)
Until The End of Lifetime (1975)
Producer:
The Unknown (1984)
The Housemaid (1984)
The Investigation is still ongoing (1979)
Director: 50 Films

Films

Television

References

Sources
https://web.archive.org/web/20150713163252/http://www.africapedia.com/TOP-AFRICAN-FILM-DIRECTORS-IN-ALPHABETICAL-ORDER

http://www.elcinema.com/person/pr1096229/

1936 births
2001 deaths
Cairo University alumni 
Film directors from Cairo
University of California alumni